Roshu Kha, also called Rasu Khan, is a Bangladeshi confessed serial killer. Arrested in 2009, he admitted to killing 11 female garment workers in Chandpur District. He was sentenced to death in 2015 for the 2008 rape and murder of a 19-year-old woman.

References

Bangladeshi people convicted of murder
Bangladeshi serial killers
Living people
Male serial killers
People from Chandpur District
Prisoners sentenced to death by Bangladesh
Violence against women in Bangladesh
Year of birth missing (living people)